Perralderia is a genus of flowering plants in the daisy family and is native to Africa. In particular, it is native to Algeria, Libya, Morocco, and Western Sahara.

In naming the genus, Perralderia, Ernest Cosson was honouring his friend Henri Letourneux de la Perraudiere (a fellow botanist).

References

Asteraceae genera
Plants described in 1859
Taxa named by Ernest Cosson
Flora of Africa
Inuleae